Narendra Modi is an Indian politician serving as the 14th and current prime minister of India since 2014.

Modi may also refer to:

People
 Modi (surname), a surname in India, including a list of people with the name

Geography
 Modi, Chania, a village in Western Crete, Greece
 Modi, Thessaloniki, a village in Central Macedonia, Greece
 Modi (Meteora), a rock in Meteora, Greece
 Módi, an alternate rendering of Modhia, an island in the Ionian Sea
 Minoan Modi, the site of a Minoan peak sanctuary in Eastern Crete, Greece
 Ouro Modi, a commune in Mali
 Modi Khola, a tributary of the Gandaki

Companies and organizations
 ModiCorp, a media company
 ModiLuft, an Indian airlines company
 Modi Enterprises, an Indian group of companies

Other uses
 Modi script, the historical script used in the Maratha empire
 Modi (Unicode block), a unicode block for Modi scripts
 Móði, one of Thor's sons in Norse mythology
 Microsoft Office Document Imaging

See also 

 Emperor Mo (disambiguation), several Chinese emperors Mo Di
 
 Mo (disambiguation)
 Di (disambiguation)
 Modia (disambiguation)
 Modis (disambiguation)